Paraharmochirus is a genus of Papuan jumping spiders that was first described by C. Szombathy in 1915.  it contains only two species, found only in Papua New Guinea: P. monstrosus and P. tualapaensis. The name is a combination of the Ancient Greek "para", meaning "alongside", and the salticid genus Harmochirus.

References

Salticidae genera
Arthropods of New Guinea
Salticidae
Spiders of Asia